Jann Mardenborough (born 9 September 1991) is a British professional racing driver competing in the Japanese Super GT series. In 2011 he became the third (and youngest) winner of the GT Academy competition, beating 90,000 entrants. He was rewarded with a drive for Nissan at the Dubai 24 Hour race. Subsequently, he competed in the F3 European Championship and the GP3 Series, winning a race in Hockenheim. He also competed in the 24 Hours of Le Mans, finishing third in the LMP2 class on his debut in 2013. He competed for Nissan Motorsports in the 2015 FIA World Endurance Championship, but the team withdrew from the series after one race due to a very uncompetitive car.

Since then, he has raced in Japan in the Super GT and Super Formula championships. In 2016, he won a race and was in championship contention in the GT300 class of Super GT. Then in 2017, he joined the GT500 class where he still competes in 2019, and has scored a podium. 2017 was his only season in Super Formula, where he scored a pole position.

Personal life
Mardenborough, born in Darlington, is the son of English footballer Steve Mardenborough. He spent most of his childhood growing up in Cardiff.

Career
Mardenborough had not seriously raced prior to entering GT Academy. Mardenborough's rise is unusual because up until 2011 at the age of 19 he had never seriously competed in motorsport.

In 2011 Mardenborough participated in the GT Academy; he beat 90,000 other entrants and won the competition, and the prize for his victory was a drive with Nissan at the Dubai 24 Hour. He scored third in his class. In 2012 Mardenborough competed in the British GT Championship. Together with Alex Buncombe he won a race and ended the season in sixth place in the GT3 championship. Moreover, he took part in four rounds of the Blancpain Endurance Series.

In 2013 Mardenborough switched to formula racing. At the beginning of the year Mardenborough started in the 2013 season of the Toyota Racing Series in New Zealand. He was the best placed rookie and finished the season in the tenth place in the championship. After that he returned to Europe and secured a seat with Carlin Motorsport in the 2013 campaign of the FIA European Formula Three Championship, as well as the British Formula 3 Championship. After one season in F3 Mardenborough joined Arden International to compete in the 2014 GP3 Series season, and was also signed by the Red Bull Junior Team driver development programme. He won his first GP3 race in Germany after a reverse grid pole position in the sprint race and setting the fastest lap.

At the 2014 Goodwood Festival of Speed, Mardenborough set the fastest ever Supercar time up the famous "Goodwood Hill" whilst piloting the Nismo Nissan GT-R with the optional ‘Time Attack’ package.

Mardenborough also continued racing in GP3, switching to Carlin for the 2015 season.

On 28 March 2015, his GT3-class Nissan GT-R Nismo caught air at the Flugplatz section of the Nürburgring Nordschleife. It cartwheeled over the fence into spectators. One person was killed, while Mardenborough was not seriously injured.

Mardenborough's achievements and growing global profile led to Sports Pro Media naming him on their list of the 50 most marketable athletes in the world.

From 2017, Mardenborough raced in the Super Formula Series in Japan with Toyota. From 2017 to 2018, Mardenborough competed for Team Impul in Super GT. In 2019, he raced for Kondō Racing.

Racing record

Career summary

Complete British GT Championship results

Complete FIA Formula 3 European Championship results
(key)

24 Hours of Le Mans

Complete GP3 Series results
(key) (Races in bold indicate pole position) (Races in italics indicate fastest lap)

Complete WeatherTech SportsCar Championship results
(key) (Races in bold indicate pole position) (Races in italics indicate fastest lap)

Complete FIA World Endurance Championship results

Complete GP2 Series results
(key) (Races in bold indicate pole position) (Races in italics indicate fastest lap)

Complete Macau Grand Prix results

Complete Super GT results
(key) (Races in bold indicate pole position) (Races in italics indicate fastest lap)

‡ Half points awarded as less than 75% of race distance was completed.

Complete Super Formula Results
(Races in bold indicate pole position)

References

External links

1991 births
Living people
Sportspeople from Darlington
English racing drivers
Toyota Racing Series drivers
FIA Formula 3 European Championship drivers
British Formula Three Championship drivers
Blancpain Endurance Series drivers
24 Hours of Le Mans drivers
FIA World Endurance Championship drivers
WeatherTech SportsCar Championship drivers
GP3 Series drivers
GP2 Series drivers
24 Hours of Spa drivers
GT Academy participants
Welsh racing drivers
People educated at Radyr Comprehensive School
Super Formula drivers
Britcar 24-hour drivers
24H Series drivers
Arden International drivers
Carlin racing drivers
Nismo drivers
Kelly Racing drivers
OAK Racing drivers
Kondō Racing drivers
Greaves Motorsport drivers
GT4 European Series drivers
B-Max Racing drivers